Jesús Daniel Gallardo Vasconcelos (born 15 August 1994) is a Mexican professional footballer who plays as a left-back for Liga MX club Monterrey and the Mexico national team.

Club career

Youth
Gallardo began his career at 15 years old with Once Hermanos from 2009, until making the switch to Jaguares de la 48 in 2011, and ultimately getting the attention of first division team Club Universidad Nacional. From there, in 2013, he joined Pumas UNAM youth academy, successfully going through the U-20 team and Pumas Morelos.

UNAM
In 2014, Gallardo was eventually promoted to the first team by coach Guillermo Vázquez. Gallardo scored his first goal with UNAM in a Copa MX group stage match against Toluca on 16 September 2014 that marked his debut with the jersey that ended 2–2 but didn't make his competitive league debut in Liga MX until 23 November 2014 which ended in a 4–2 win against Monterrey.

On 21 November 2016, he would score a brace against W Connection F.C. during the 2016–17 CONCACAF Champions League group stage that ended 8–1.

On 9 August 2017, during an Apertura 2017 Copa MX group stage match against Monterrey, he would score the tying goal during stoppage time, leaving the match 1–1.

Monterrey
On 29 May 2018, Gallardo joined Monterrey. He would make his debut with the team on 21 July 2018 as a starter against Pachuca, winning 1–0. On 29 September, he would score his first goal with Monterrey, scoring on the 74th minute in a 3–0 win over Tijuana. On 20 October, in a league match against Toluca, he scored the tying goal at the 73rd minute in which Monterrey would later go on to win 2–1.

On 23 October he scored the decisive penalty in the shootout of the Apertura 2018 Copa MX semi-finals against Pachuca, sending his team to the final. On 3 November he provided an assist and scored a goal in Monterrey's 2–0 victory over Veracruz.

As Monterrey won the 2019 CONCACAF Champions League Finals against crosstown rivals Tigres UANL, he was included in the Team of the Tournament.

At the end of the December, he would win the Apertura championship finals against América.

With Monterrey's victory of the 2019–20 Copa MX, they had obtained the continental treble.

International career
Gallardo received his first call up to the senior national team to replace the injured Ángel Sepúlveda for matches against New Zealand and Panama in October 2016, making his international debut on the 8th of the month as a starter against New Zealand in a 2–1 victory, contributing a crucial pass for the winning goal.

On 28 June 2017, Gallardo was called up to participate in the 2017 CONCACAF Gold Cup, managing to appear in all games until their 1–0 semi-final loss against Jamaica.

In May 2018, Gallardo was named in Mexico's preliminary 28-man squad for the World Cup, and in June, was ultimately included in the final 23-man roster. During Mexico's final group stage match against Sweden, he would receive a yellow card at the 13th second of the match for his elbow contact made with Ola Toivonen's face, marking it as the fastest yellow card given in FIFA World Cup history. He would go on to play as a starter for all of the group stage matches, including the round-of-16 loss against Brazil.

He was included in Gerardo Martino's preliminary roster for the 2019 CONCACAF Gold Cup and was eventually in the final list. He appeared in all matches of the tournament, as Mexico defeated the United States in the final. He was listed in the tournament's Best XI. Following the victory, Martino declared Gallardo to be the best player of the match.

In October 2022, Gallardo was named in Mexico's preliminary 31-man squad for the World Cup, and in November, was ultimately included in the final 26-man roster.

Style of play
Gallardo is known for intensity, pace, and physical strength, allowing him to be both dangerous and intense during a whole match. FIFA described him as "Gallardo's many assets include his speed, ability to take people on and his selfless distribution. A regular source of assists and the archetypal team player, he is adept at pressing high up the pitch and catching opponents out of position."

Starting off as a left-winger on the club level, former Mexico national team coach Juan Carlos Osorio used him on a more defensive position as left-back. With the arrival of new national team coach Gerardo Martino, he chose to keep him as a left-back.

Career statistics

Club

International

International goals

Honours
Monterrey
Liga MX: Apertura 2019
Copa MX: 2019–20
CONCACAF Champions League: 2019, 2021

Mexico
CONCACAF Gold Cup: 2019

Individual
CONCACAF Champions League Team of the Tournament: 2019, 2021
CONCACAF Gold Cup Best XI: 2019

References

External links
 

1994 births
Living people
Mexico international footballers
Association football midfielders
Association football utility players
Club Universidad Nacional footballers
C.F. Monterrey players
Liga MX players
Liga Premier de México players
Tercera División de México players
2017 CONCACAF Gold Cup players
2018 FIFA World Cup players
2019 CONCACAF Gold Cup players
2021 CONCACAF Gold Cup players
CONCACAF Gold Cup-winning players
Footballers from Tabasco
People from Cárdenas, Tabasco
2022 FIFA World Cup players
Mexican footballers